UPL Limited, formerly United Phosphorus Limited, is an Indian multinational company that manufactures and markets agrochemicals, industrial chemicals, chemical intermediates, and specialty chemicals, and also offers pesticides. Headquartered in Mumbai, Maharashtra, the company engages in both agro and non-agro activities. The agro-business is the company's primary source of revenue and includes the manufacture and marketing of conventional agrochemical products, seeds, and other agricultural-related products. The non-agro segment includes manufacturing and marketing industrial chemicals and other nonagricultural products such as fungicides, herbicides, insecticides, plant growth regulators, rodenticides, industrial & specialty chemicals, and nutrifeeds. UPL products are sold in 150+ countries.

United Phosphorus Limited was established on 29 May 1969. The company changed its name to UPL Limited in October 2013.

On 20 July 2018, UPL signed a US$4.2 billion agreement with Platform Specialty Products Corporation (now Element Solutions Inc.) to acquire control of Arysta LifeScience Inc. The acquisition was completed in February 2019, making UPL the fifth largest generic agrochemicals company in the world after Bayer, Dupont, Syngenta and BASF.

References

Indian companies established in 1969
Chemical companies of India
NIFTY 50
Chemical companies established in 1969
1969 establishments in Maharashtra
Companies listed on the National Stock Exchange of India
Companies listed on the Bombay Stock Exchange
Companies based in Mumbai
Agriculture companies of India